This is a list of all tornadoes that were confirmed by local offices of the National Weather Service in the United States in April 2011. April was the most active tornado month in United States history, with 773 tornadoes being confirmed from April 4 to April 30. The first tornado event of the month accompanied a large-scale damaging wind event, during which eight people were killed by falling trees. The severe weather outbreak also produced 46 tornadoes, mainly across Arkansas, Kentucky, and Mississippi. Tornado activity continued into early April 5, where an EF2 tornado in Dodge County, Georgia, resulted in one fatality. A couple tornadoes, EF1 and EF2, struck Pulaski County, Virginia, on April 8, ahead of a second outbreak from April 9–11. This outbreak significantly impacted the Upper Midwest, including Iowa and Wisconsin. Iowa was struck by numerous tornadoes on April 9, including three rated EF3 and one rated EF4, mainly affecting Sac, Buena Vista, and Pocahontas counties. Sixteen tornadoes touched down in Wisconsin on April 10, including an EF3 tornado that struck Merrill, ranking the outbreak as the state's largest April event on record as well as one of the largest single-day outbreaks ever. Although no one was killed, nineteen people were injured during the outbreak.

April 14–16 brought a much larger tornado outbreak across the Southern United States, with 178 tornadoes from Oklahoma to Virginia. A multiple-vortex EF3 tornado struck Tushka and Atoka, Oklahoma on April 14, resulting in major damage and two fatalities. Two more people were killed in Little Rock, Arkansas just after midnight. During the late morning and afternoon of April 15, multiple strong tornadoes impacted Mississippi and Alabama, including six EF3 tornadoes that hit places such as Clinton, Mississippi; Leakesville, Mississippi; De Kalb, Mississippi; Geiger, Alabama; Tuscaloosa, Alabama; and Pine Level, Alabama. In total, twelve people were killed on April 14–15, while 26 more fatalities occurred across North Carolina and Virginia on April 16. Major tornado damage occurred in and around Sanford, Raleigh, Fayetteville, Askewville, and Snow Hill, North Carolina, along with Deltaville and Clopton, Virginia. Like the previous day, April 16 also featured six EF3 tornadoes. Another period of elevated tornado activity took place from April 19–24, with 132 tornadoes over six days. Although the events featured mostly weaker tornadoes, an intense EF3 tornado injured two people in Illinois on April 19 and a violent EF4 tornado struck suburbs of St. Louis, Missouri, causing multiple injuries and severely impacting Lambert–St. Louis International Airport. Weaker activity on April 23–24 led into a much larger outbreak.

From April 25–28, 359 tornadoes occurred across 21 states in the Southern, Midwestern, and Northeastern United States in what became known as the 2011 Super Outbreak. Numerous tornadoes touched down across Texas and Arkansas on April 25, including an EF3 tornado near Hot Springs Village, Arkansas that caused significant damage and killed one person and a long-track EF2 tornado in the Vilonia, Arkansas area that killed four people and injured 16 others while staying down for over an hour. April 26 saw mostly weaker tornadoes and no fatalities, with the notable tornadoes of the day being an EF2 tornado that tracked across parts of Texas and into Louisiana and a brief EF3 tornado that struck Campbell Army Airfield. From the 27th to early on the 28th, a series of devastating, long-tracked, violent tornadoes killed over 300 people throughout an area extending from Mississippi to Virginia. This included eleven tornadoes rated EF4 and four rated EF5. One particularly devastating and long-lived EF5 wedge tornado tore across northern Alabama and into Tennessee, killing 72 people, while a large, long-tracked EF4 wedge tornado caused catastrophic damage in densely populated areas of Tuscaloosa and Birmingham, Alabama, killing 64 people. Over 215 tornadoes occurred occurred on April 27 alone.

Numerous other small towns including Smithville, Mississippi; Cordova, Alabama; Rainsville, Alabama; Ohatchee, Alabama; Cullman, Alabama; Trenton, Georgia; Ringgold, Georgia; Apison, Tennessee; and Glade Spring, Virginia sustained devastating, direct hits from intense tornadoes during the outbreak, with several producing death tolls well into the double digits. 319 tornado-related deaths occurred from April 27–28, bringing the total death toll from April 25–28 to 324 from 31 separate tornadoes; 24 additional fatalities occurred from separate thunderstorm impacts. The outbreak continued during the overnight and into the morning of April 28, with 47 more tornadoes occurring from Florida to New York. Most of the tornadoes very relatively weak and caused comparatively minor damage. Much of the tornado activity ceased by mid-morning, with only ten tornadoes occurring during the afternoon as the outbreak came to an end. This outbreak was followed by three weak tornadoes in Texas on April 30 to end the month.

During the course of the month, 363 people were killed as a direct result of 43 different tornadoes, while over 3,700 people were injured; most of the casualties occurred on April 27.

United States yearly total

April

April 4 event

April 5 event

April 7 event

April 8 event

April 9 event

April 10 event

April 11 event

April 14 to April 16 events

A total of 178 tornadoes touched down in this large tornado outbreak.

April 14 event (Western United States)

April 19 to April 24 events

A total of 134 tornadoes touched down in this extended tornado outbreak sequence.

April 25 to April 28 events

A total of 360 tornadoes touched down in this extremely large tornado outbreak, 359 in the United States and one in Canada.

April 30 event

See also
 Tornadoes of 2011

References

Notes

United States,04
Tornadoes,04
2011,04
Tornadoes

zh:2011年美國龍捲風災